Limnaecia cirrhochrosta is a moth in the family Cosmopterigidae. It is found on Fiji.

References

Natural History Museum Lepidoptera generic names catalog

Limnaecia
Moths described in 1933
Taxa named by Edward Meyrick
Moths of Fiji